The  has its source in the city of Minokamo, Gifu Prefecture, Japan. It then forms the border between Minokamo and Kawabe and flows through Tomika, before flowing into the Tsubo River.

River communities 
The river passes through or forms the boundary of the following communities:

Gifu Prefecture
Minokamo, Kawabe, Tomika

References 

Rivers of Gifu Prefecture
Rivers of Japan

ja:長良川